Anita Colby (born Anita Counihan; August 5, 1914– March 27, 1992) was an American model, actress, and business consultant.

Biography
Colby was born Anita Counihan, the daughter of Margaret Anne McCarthy and the cartoonist Daniel Francis "Bud" Counihan, a legendary figure among New York City artists and newsmen, in Washington, D.C. Her younger sister Francine Counihan was a model. Early in Colby's career, at $50 an hour, she was the highest paid model at the time. She was nicknamed "The Face" and appeared on numerous billboards and ads, many of them for cigarette advertisers.

She moved to Hollywood from New York in 1935 and changed her name to Colby. She had a bit part in Mary of Scotland (1936) and other B movies, but her acting career never took off. After two years, she returned to New York and became an ad salesperson for Harper's Bazaar. She made her name in Hollywood almost 10 years after leaving films when she worked on a nationwide advertising campaign for the film Cover Girl (1944), in which she also appeared with her sister Francine Counihan. She began acting in films again in the 1940s, including Brute Force (1947).

Colby was hired by David O. Selznick in the 1940s to teach contract actresses, such as Jennifer Jones, about beauty, poise, and publicity. Her job title at his production company, Selznick International Pictures, was "Feminine Director". She worked closely with Selznick's top actresses, such as Jennifer Jones, Ingrid Bergman, Shirley Temple, Dorothy McGuire, and Joan Fontaine. She wrote Anita Colby's Beauty Book in 1952. Colby later hosted the television program The Pepsi-Cola Playhouse in 1954. The same year, she received a patent for a chair convertible into an inclined bed (filed in 1952). She was a devout Catholic. 

Colby died of lung disease at her home in Oyster Bay, Long Island, on March 27, 1992, aged 77.

Filmography

 The Christophers (1 episode, 1963)
 The Pepsi-Cola Playhouse (1954) as Host
 Brute Force (1947) as Flossie
 Cover Girl (1944) as Miss Colby
 China Passage (1937, uncredited) as the Nurse
 Walking on Air (1936) as Ex-Mrs. Fred Randolph
 Mary of Scotland (1936) as Mary Fleming
 The Bride Walks Out (1936, uncredited) as Saleslady

References

External links

American film actresses
American Roman Catholics
20th-century American actresses
Female models from New York (state)
1914 births
1992 deaths